The 2015–16 Copa Argentina was the seventh edition of the Copa Argentina, and the fifth since the relaunch of the tournament in 2011. The competition began on January 29, 2016. Defending champions Boca Juniors were eliminated by Rosario Central in the Quarterfinals. By winning the competition, River Plate won the right to play in the 2017 Copa Libertadores and the 2016 Supercopa Argentina.

Teams 
Seventy-five teams took part in this competition: All teams from the Primera División (30); twelve teams of the Primera B Nacional; five from the Primera B Metropolitana, four from the Primera C; two from the Primera D; ten teams from Federal A and twelve (12) from Torneo Federal B.

First Level

Primera División 
All thirty teams qualified.

  Aldosivi
  Argentinos Juniors
  Arsenal
  Atlético de Rafaela
  Banfield
  Belgrano
  Boca JuniorsTH 
  Colón
  Crucero del Norte
  Defensa y Justicia
  Estudiantes (LP)
  Gimnasia y Esgrima (LP)
  Godoy Cruz
  Huracán
  Independiente
  Lanús
  Newell's Old Boys
  Nueva Chicago
  Olimpo
  Quilmes
  Racing Club
  River Plate
  Rosario Central
  San Lorenzo
  San Martín (SJ)
  Sarmiento
  Temperley
  Tigre
  Unión
  Vélez Sársfield

Second Level 
The first twelve teams from 2015 tournament qualified.

Primera B Nacional 

  Atlético Tucumán
  Patronato
  Ferro Carril Oeste
  Santamarina
  Instituto
  Villa Dálmine
  Atlético Paraná
  Douglas Haig
  Estudiantes (SL)
  Gimnasia y Esgrima (J)
  Los Andes
  Juventud Unida (G)

Third Level

Primera B Metropolitana 
The champion and the four teams that reached the semifinals of the Torneo Reducido qualified.

  Brown
  Estudiantes (BA)
  Defensores de Belgrano
  Deportivo Morón
  Almagro

Torneo Federal A 
The two teams promoted, the losing team of the seventh stage, two losing teams of the sixth stage, four losing teams of the fifth stage, and the best losing team of the fourth stage of the 2015 tournament qualified.

  Talleres (C)
  Juventud Unida Universitario
  Unión (S)
  Defensores de Belgrano (VR)
  Unión Aconquija
  Gimnasia y Tiro
  Cipolletti
  Deportivo Madryn
  San Lorenzo (A)
  Juventud Antoniana

Fourth Level

Primera C Metropolitana 
The first 4 teams from 2015 tournament qualified.

 San Telmo
  Laferrere
  Talleres (RdE)
  Central Córdoba (R)

Torneo Federal B 
The three teams promoted, the three losing teams of the fifth stage, and six losing teams of the fourth stage of the 2015 tournament qualified.

  Villa Mitre
  Defensores (P)
  Güemes
  Sportivo Rivadavia
  San Martín (M)
  San Martín (F)
  Germinal
  Sansinena
 La Emilia
  Unión Santiago
  Sportivo Guzmán
  Central Norte

Fifth Level

Primera D Metropolitana 
The champion and the runners-up of the 2015 tournament qualified.

  Sportivo Barracas
  Atlas

Round and draw dates

Regional Round 
This round is organized by the Consejo Federal.

Group A 
In this first round, 7 teams from the Torneo Federal A and 9 teams from the Torneo Federal B participated. The round was played between January 31 and February 20, on a home-and-away two-legged tie. The 8 winning teams advanced to the Final Round.

|-

|-

|-

|-

|-

|-

|-

|-

|}

First leg

Second leg

Gimnasia y Tiro won 2–1 on aggregate.

Unión Aconquija won 5–1 on aggregate.

Defensores de Belgrano (VR) won 5–3 on aggregate.

Unión (S) won 3–1 on aggregate.

San Martín (F) won 3–1 on aggregate.

2–2 on aggregate. Sportivo Rivadavia won on away goals.

Deportivo Madryn won 5–0 on aggregate.

Sansiena won 2–1 on aggregate.

Group B 
In this round, 3 teams from the Torneo Federal A and 3 teams from the Torneo Federal B participated. The round was played between January 29 and February 17, on a home-and-away two-legged tie. The 3 winning teams advanced to the Final Round.

|-

|-

|-

|}

First leg

Second leg

Güemes won 5–3 on aggregate.

Talleres (C) won 4–2 on aggregate.

2–2 on aggregate. Villa Mitre won 5–4 on penalties.

Final Round

Bracket

Upper bracket

Lower bracket

Round of 64 
This round will have 11 qualified teams from the Regional Round, 11 qualified teams from the Metropolitan Zone (5 teams from Primera B Metro; 4 teams from Primera C and 2 teams from Primera D), 12 teams from Primera B Nacional and 30 teams from Primera División. The round was played between May 4 and July 31, in a single knock-out match format. The 32 winning teams advanced to the Round of 32. The draw took place on April 7, 2016.

Round of 32 
This round will have the 32 qualified teams from the Round of 64. The round was played between August 2 and August 31, in a single knock-out match format. The 16 winning teams advanced to the Round of 16.

Round of 16 
This round will have the 16 qualified teams from the Round of 32. The round was played between September 3 and October 19, in a single knock-out match format. The 8 winning teams advanced to the Quarterfinals.

Quarterfinals 
This round will have the 8 qualified teams from the Round of 16. The round was played between October 5 and November 17, in a single knock-out match format. The 4 winning teams advanced to the Semifinals.

Semifinals 
This round will have the 4 qualified teams from the Quarterfinals. The round was played between November 30 and December 1, in a single knock-out match format. The 2 winning teams advanced to the Final.

Final

Top goalscorers

References

External links 
 Official site 
 Copa Argentina on the Argentine Football Association's website 

2015
Argentina
2016 in Argentine football
2015 in Argentine football